Apple Valley is an unincorporated community in Jackson County, in the U.S. state of Georgia.

History
A post office was in operation at Apple Valley from 1877 until 1903. The community was named after an apple orchard near the original town site.

References

Unincorporated communities in Jackson County, Georgia